Martin Jakubko  (born 26 February 1980) is a Slovak former professional footballer who played as a forward. He played for the Slovakia national team 41 times and scored 9 goals.

International career
On 30 November 2004, Jakubko made his international debut for Slovakia in the 1–0 victory over Hungary at the 2004 King's Cup. He scored his first international goal against Poland in friendly match on 7 February 2007. During the 2010 FIFA World Cup qualification he played six games and helped to qualify at the tournament, scoring two2 goals. Jakubko played six minutes at the 2010 FIFA World Cup against the Netherlands and earned a penalty kick, which was successfully taken by Róbert Vittek.

Career statistics
Scores and results list Slovakia's goal tally first, score column indicates score after each Jakubko goal.

References

External links
 
 Martin Jakubko at saturn-fc.ru
 
 

1980 births
Living people
People from Prešov District
Sportspeople from the Prešov Region
Slovak footballers
Association football forwards
Slovakia international footballers
2010 FIFA World Cup players
Slovak Super Liga players
Russian Premier League players
FC Saturn Ramenskoye players
FC Khimki players
FC Moscow players
FC Dynamo Moscow players
FC Amkar Perm players
MFK Vranov nad Topľou players
1. FC Tatran Prešov players
FK Dukla Banská Bystrica players
MFK Ružomberok players
Slovak expatriate footballers
Slovak expatriate sportspeople in Russia
Expatriate footballers in Russia